Ottawa is an unincorporated community and coal town in Boone County, West Virginia, United States. Ottawa has a post office with ZIP code 25149.

The community was named after the Ottawa Indians.

References

Unincorporated communities in Boone County, West Virginia
Unincorporated communities in West Virginia
Coal towns in West Virginia